is a passenger railway station located in the city of Gobō, Wakayama Prefecture, Japan, operated by the private Kishū Railway

Lines

Station layout
The station consists of one side platform serving a single deadheaded bi-directional track. The station is unattended.

Adjacent stations

History
It was renamed to its present name a few days later.

Passenger statistics
In fiscal 2019, the station was used by an average of 42 passengers daily (boarding passengers only).

Surrounding Area
  (a.k.a. Hidaka Gobō)
 Kotake Hachimangu Shrine

See also
List of railway stations in Japan

References

External links

Railway stations in Japan opened in 1932
Railway stations in Wakayama Prefecture
Gobō, Wakayama